Roman Karasyuk (born 27 March 1991 in Volodymyr-Volynskyi, Volyn Oblast, Ukrainian SSR, Soviet Union) is a professional Ukrainian football midfielder who played for Rukh Lviv.

Career
Karasyuk began his playing career in sportive school in native town Volodymyr-Volynskyi. Than he joined to FC Volyn Lutsk team. He made his first team debut entering as a second-half substitute against FC Dynamo-2 Kyiv on 11 October 2008.

In 2008, Karasyuk was called up to the Ukraine national under-19 football team for a series of matches in preparation for the 2010 UEFA European Under-19 Championship.

References

External links 
 Profile at Official club site (Ukr)
 Profile at Unofficial club site (Ukr)
 
 

1991 births
Living people
People from Volodymyr-Volynskyi
Ukrainian footballers
Ukrainian expatriate footballers
FC Volyn Lutsk players
FC Stal Alchevsk players
FC Stal Kamianske players
NK Veres Rivne players
Kisvárda FC players
FC Rukh Lviv players
Ukrainian Premier League players
Ukrainian First League players
Association football midfielders
Nemzeti Bajnokság I players
Expatriate footballers in Hungary
Ukrainian expatriate sportspeople in Hungary
Ukraine youth international footballers
Sportspeople from Volyn Oblast